The thirty-first season of Saturday Night Live, an American sketch comedy series, originally aired in the United States on NBC between October 1, 2005, and May 20, 2006. 19 episodes were produced (rather than the usual 20) due to the 2006 Winter Olympic Games and network budget cuts.

History
This season is notable for the people who hosted the show. Julia Louis-Dreyfus, an SNL cast member from 1982 to 1985 under Dick Ebersol, became the first former female cast member to come back and host the show (and also the third cast member from Seinfeld to host). Gilda Radner was originally supposed to host in 1988, but could not due to the Writers Guild of America strike and then Radner's death the following year. This season is also known for the return of such frequent hosts as Alec Baldwin (who last hosted in season 29 with musical guest Missy Elliott in 2003), Tom Hanks (who last hosted the first episode of season 22 with musical guest Tom Petty and the Heartbreakers in 1996), and Steve Martin (who last hosted the first episode of season 20 with musical guest Eric Clapton in 1994). 

This season saw the seventh death of a former cast member when Charles Rocket (a cast member during the notoriously lackluster 1980–1981 season) committed suicide in 2005. Rocket's suicide is the first death of an SNL cast member who never worked under Lorne Michaels (another cast member who never worked under Michaels wouldn't come until Tony Rosato died in 2017) and is the first death of a Weekend Update anchor, until Norm Macdonald in 2021.

This season was the first to broadcast in high-definition (HD), after 30 years of broadcasting in standard definition.

Cast
Before the start of the season, featured player Rob Riggle was let go from the show. Finesse Mitchell and Kenan Thompson were both promoted to repertory status, while Jason Sudeikis stayed a featured player.

The show added three new cast members: Los Angeles-based sketch comedian Bill Hader, Andy Samberg (the show also hired his two friends Akiva Schaffer and Jorma Taccone as writers, all members of The Lonely Island sketch group) and Kristen Wiig of The Groundlings. Wiig debuted on the show in November, in the episode hosted by Jason Lee. Samberg, Schaffer and Taccone would be a notable force for creating SNL Digital Shorts. One such short was "Lazy Sunday".

Tina Fey and Maya Rudolph missed episodes due to maternity leave. Fey's place on Weekend Update was briefly taken over by Horatio Sanz until her return in the episode hosted by Catherine Zeta-Jones. Fey returned to the show before her maternity leave time was up. Rudolph, however, appeared on the first episode of the new season, and then went on maternity leave and returned in February, in the episode hosted by Steve Martin.

This would also be the final season for Fey, Rachel Dratch, Finesse Mitchell, Chris Parnell and Horatio Sanz, as well as the last season for longtime director Beth McCarthy-Miller. Dratch and Fey both left the show to focus on 30 Rock, and McCarthy-Miller left on her own terms. Parnell, Mitchell, and Sanz were let go due to NBC budget cuts.

Cast roster

Repertory players
Fred Armisen
Rachel Dratch
Tina Fey
Will Forte
Darrell Hammond
Seth Meyers
Finesse Mitchell
Chris Parnell
Amy Poehler
Maya Rudolph
Horatio Sanz
Kenan Thompson

Featured players
Bill Hader
Andy Samberg
Jason Sudeikis
Kristen Wiig (first episode: November 12, 2005)

bold denotes Weekend Update anchor

Writers

There were three head writers for the 31st season: Andrew Steel, Tina Fey, and Seth Meyers.

Future cast member Colin Jost joined the writing staff this season.

Episodes

Specials

References

31
Saturday Night Live in the 2000s
2005 American television seasons
2006 American television seasons
Television shows directed by Beth McCarthy-Miller